This is a list of United States national Golden Gloves champions in the bantamweight division, along with the state or region they represented.

1928 – Joe Bozak – Chicago
1929 – Harry Garbell – Chicago
1930 – Paul Dazzo – Chicago
1931 – Nick Scialaba – Chicago
1932 – Leo Rodak – Chicago
1933 – John Ginter – Chicago
1934 – Troy Bellini – Cleveland
1935 – Johnny Brown – Chicago
1936 – Johnny Brown – Chicago
1937 – Frank Kainrath – Chicago
1938 – Frank Kainrath – Chicago
1939 – Chester Ellis – Kansas City
1940 – Dick Menchaca – Fort Worth
1941 – Dick Menchaca – Fort Worth
1942 – Jack Graves – Minneapolis
1943 – Earl O'Neal – Oklahoma City
1944 – Clayton Johnson – Sioux City
1945 – Bob Jarvis – Kansas City
1946 – Eddie Dames – St. Louis
1947 – Robert Bell – Cleveland
1948 – Melvin Barber – Des Moines
1949 – Jack McCann – Oklahoma City
1950 – Albert Crus – Los Angeles
1951 – Nate Brooks – Cleveland
1952 – James Hairston – Kansas City
1953 – Dick Martinez – Nashville
1954 – Alfred Escobar – Los Angeles
1955 – Donald Eddington – St. Louis
1956 – Vince Doniero – Toledo
1957 – Tommy Reynolds – Kansas City
1958 – Gilbert Higginbotham – Lafayette
1959 – Pat Moore – Kenosha
1960 – Petros Spanakos – Hollywood
1961 – Oscar German – Grand Rapids
1962 – James Moon – Cleveland
1963 – Emanuel Steward – Detroit
1964 – Manual Navarro – Fort Worth
1965 – Mel Miller – Billings
1966 – John North – Cincinnati
1967 – Earl Large – Roswell
1968 – Earl Large – Roswell
1969 – Oliver James – Kansas City
1970 – Dave Kibby – San Francisco
1971 – Johnny Moreno – Fort Worth
1972 – Ray Theragood – New Mexico
1973 – James Martinez – Fort Worth
1974 – Dan Hermosillo – Rocky Mountain
1975 – Miguel Ayala – Fort Worth
1976 – Barnard Taylor – Knoxville
1977 – Wayne Lynumn – Chicago
1978 – Jackie Beard – Knoxville
1979 – Ken Baysmore – Washington, DC
1980 – Myron Taylor – Pennsylvania
1981 – Steve Cruz, Jr. – Fort Worth
1982 – Meldrick Taylor – Pennsylvania
1983 – Jesse Benavidez – Fort Worth
1984 – Robert Shannon – Las Vegas
1985 – Eugene Speed – Washington, DC
1986 – Fernando Rodriguez – Pennsylvania
1987 – Fernando Rodriguez – Pennsylvania
1988 – Sergio Reyes – Fort Worth
1989 – John West – Knoxville
1990 – Sandtanner Lewis – Florida
1991 – Aristead Clayton, Jr. – Louisiana
1992 – Chris Hamilton – Texas
1993 – Terrance Churchwell – Knoxville
1994 – Errid Caldera – Cleveland
1995 – Jorge Munoz – Texas
1996 – Baldo Ramirez – Denver, Colorado
1997 – Evaristo Rodriguez – Chicago
1998 – Alfredo Torres – Texas
1999 – Calvin Stewart (boxer)Atlanta, GA
2000 – Jose Aguiniga – California
2001 – Rasheem Jefferson – Pennsylvania
2002 – Rashiem Jefferson – Pennsylvania
2003 – Sergio Ramos – California
2004 – Torrence Daniels – Colorado
2005 – Gary Russell Jr. – Washington, DC
2006 – Efraín Esquivias – California
2007 – Ronny Rios – California
2008 – Ernesto Garza – Saginaw
2009 – Jesus Magdaleno – Las Vegas
2010 - Toka Kahn-Clary - New England
2011 - Tramaine Williams - New England
2012 - Gervonta Davis - Washington, D.C.
2013 – Gary Antonio Russell – Washington D.C.
2014 – Ruben Villa – California
2015 - Ruben Villa - California
2016 - Duke Ragan - Ohio
2017 - Aaron Morales - Oklahoma
2018 – Felix Parrilla
2019 – Asa Stevens – Hawaii

References

Golden Gloves